7th Street is a street in Los Angeles, California running from S. Norton Ave in Mid-Wilshire through Downtown Los Angeles. It goes all the way to the eastern city limits at Indiana Ave., and the border between Boyle Heights, Los Angeles and East Los Angeles.

Originally agricultural land, 7th Street between Broadway (on which corner stood Bullock's) and Figueroa Street, became downtown's upscale shopping district. This began with J. W. Robinson's deciding to build their flagship store in 1915 on Seventh far to the west of the existing Broadway shopping district, between Hope and Grand streets. The Ville de Paris and Coulter's as well as numerous specialty shops came and rounded out the district.

The area lost its exclusivity when the upscale downtown stores opened branches in Hollywood, Mid-Wilshire, Westwood and Pasadena in the late 1920s through the 1940s, notably the establishment of Bullock's upscale landmark branch Bullocks Wilshire in Mid-Wilshire in 1929.

Thirteen large office buildings opened between 1920 and 1928. By 1929, every plot on 7th between Figueroa and Los Angeles Streets had been developed.
The area remained an important, if not the most exclusive, center of retail and office space throughout the 1950s, but started a slow decline throughout the 1980s due to suburbanization. It was also the concentration of Downtown financial activity on Bunker Hill, a few blocks north. The flagship department stores like Bullock's (1983), Barker Brothers (1984) and Robinson's (1993) had closed and only the Broadway/Macy's at The Bloc, previously named Broadway Plaza remained. However, in 1986, the Seventh Market Place mall, now FIGat7th, opened, bringing a smaller retail cluster back to Seventh such as the 7th Street/Metro Center station opening in 1991.

With new, large skyscrapers such as the Wilshire Grand Center and the nearby U.S. Bank Tower bridging the gap with Bunker Hill, Seventh Street is now contiguous to the large financial district to the north and is once again a highly desired office district.

Landmarks
In order west to east. Source: Los Angeles Conservancy.

Harbor Freeway to Figueroa

Wilshire Grand Center, north side, tallest building in the Western United States. Located on the site of the original Wilshire Grand Hotel, opened in 1952 as the Hotel Statler. In 1954, renamed the Statler Hilton. In 1968, renovated and renamed the Los Angeles Hilton, and later the Los Angeles Hilton and Towers. Renovated again in 1963.
FIGat7th, shopping center, originally called Seventh Market Place, housing both a Bullock's and May Co. branch in the 1980s-1990s

Figueroa to Flower

Barker Brothers Building (818 Building) 818 W. Seventh Street, Curlett and Beelman (1926), Los Angeles Historic-Cultural Monument #356, Renaissance Revival, home of Barker Bros. furniture and homewares department store. Now offices.
Home Savings of America Tower (Figueroa Tower), 831 W. Seventh Street, Albert C. Martin and Associates (1989). 
Fine Arts Building, 811 W. Seventh Street, Walker and Eisen (1926), Los Angeles Historic-Cultural Monument #125
7th Street/Metro Center light rail (A and E lines) and subway (B and D lines) station at 7th & Flower

Flower to Hope

Roosevelt Building (The Roosevelt), 727 W. Seventh Street, Curlett and Beelman (1927), Los Angeles Historic-Cultural Monument #355/ National Register of Historic Places: Renaissance Revival building, purported to be the largest office building in Southern California when it opened. Curlett and Beelman designed six buildings on Seventh Street. Converted in 2008 to 222 residential units. Spectacular original restored mosaic marble floors in the lobby.
The Bloc Los Angeles, originally built in 1973 called the Broadway Plaza, housing The Broadway department store after it moved from Broadway and 4th streets, now a Macy's

Hope to Grand

J. W. Robinson's Building, 600 W. Seventh Street, Noonan and Richards  (1915), Edgar Mayberry with Allison and Allison (1934 remodel), Los Angeles. The first major department store to move to Seventh Street from Broadway. Almost nine acres of floor space on seven floors. Robinson’s was immediately successful and spurred the further development of 7th Street as an upscale shopping district. In 1934, a major remodel gave the store its current Moderne façade, replacing the original Beaux Arts design.
Union Oil Building, 617 W. Seventh Street, Curlett and Beelman (1923)
Broadway Plaza (later Macy’s Plaza, now The Bloc), 700 W. Seventh Street, Charles Luckman Associates (1973): hotel, offices and shopping center originally with a Broadway department store branch replacing its downtown flagship on Broadway (the street)

Grand to Olive

Brockman Building, 530 W. Seventh Street, Barnett, Haynes and Barnett (1912), National Register of Historic Places
Quinby Building, 529 W. Seventh Street, Meyer and Holler (1926)
Bronson Building (The Collection), 527 W. Seventh Street, Austin and Pennell (1913). Originally the Brack Shops, independent shops grouped together as a sort of department store. 
Brock and Company Building (Mas Malo/ Seven Grand), 515 W. Seventh Street, Dodd and Richards (1922), Los Angeles Historic-Cultural Monument #358
Bank of Italy (Giannini Place), 505 W. Seventh Street, Morgan, Walls and Morgan (1922), Los Angeles Historic-Cultural Monument #354
Coulter Dry Goods Company (later Myer Siegel, Dohrmann's, now The Mandel), 500 W. Seventh Street, Dodd and Richards (1917)

Olive to Hill

Los Angeles Athletic Club, 431 W. Seventh Street, Parkinson and Bergstrom (1912), Los Angeles Historic-Cultural Monument
Ville de Paris (department store), now L.A. Jewelry Mart, 420 W. Seventh Street, Dodd and Richards (1917)
Dunn-Williams Building (Spreckels Building), fronting 7th and Hill, Samuel Heiman (1922), Los Angeles Historic- Cultural Monument #984
Huntsberger-Mennell Building (International Jewelry Mart), 412 W. Seventh Street, Dodd and Richards (1917)
 Warner Brothers Theatre (a.k.a. Pantages Theatre, now "Jewelry Theater Center") 401 W. Seventh Street, B. Marcus Priteca (1920)
Foreman & Clark Building (Jewelry Design Center), 400 W. Seventh Street, Curlett and Beelman (1928), Gothic Revival-style structure
Sun Drug Building (later Great Western Savings, now Great Western Jewelry Plaza) 700 S. Hill Street (corner 7th), Curlett and Beelman (1922)

7th & Broadway

Loew's State Theatre, 300 W. Seventh Street (SW corner of Broadway), Weeks and Day (1921), Los Angeles Historic-Cultural Monument #522/ National Register of Historic Places (Broadway Historic Theatre and Commercial District)
Bullock’s Building (St. Vincent Jewelry Center), 319 W. Seventh Street (NW corner of Broadway), Parkinson and Bergstrom (1906), National Register of Historic Places, Broadway Historic Theatre and Commercial District
St. Vincent's Court, small alley running through the center of the former Bullock's complex, built in the 1860s as the main entrance to St. Vincent’s College (now Loyola Marymount University) which then occupied the site. In 1956, a city boosters remodeled it as a faux European village square.
Western Terminus of Route 66, Seventh Street at Broadway

Broadway to Spring

Haas Building, 219 W. Seventh Street, Morgan, Walls and Morgan (1915), offices, 12 stories, Beaux Arts with terra cotta ornamentation, metal skin added in the 1970s. Now apartments.
A.G. Bartlett Building a.k.a. Union Oil Building, The Bartlett, 215 W. Seventh Street, Parkinson and Bergstrom (1911), National Register of Historic Places (Spring Street Financial District), Beaux Arts, offices.
I. N. Van Nuys Building (Van Nuys Apartments, 210 W. Seventh Street, Morgan, Walls and Morgan (1911), Los Angeles Historic-Cultural Monument #898/ National Register of Historic Places (Spring Street Financial District), since 1982 apartments, Beaux Arts.

Spring to Main
Hellman Commercial Trust and Savings Bank, 650 S. Spring Street (corner of 7th), Schultze and Weaver (1925) National Register of Historic Places (Spring Street Financial District), Spanish Revival style.  Since 2009, apartments. Former banking lobby serves as event space and filming location.
Financial Center Building, 140 W. Seventh Street, Norton and Wallis, (1924), National Register of Historic Places (Spring Street Financial District)

7th & Main

Los Angeles Board of Trade Building / California Stock Exchange (SW corner 7th/Main), 111 W. Seventh Street, Curlett and Beelman (1926), since 2009, apartments. Winged creatures adorn the building.
Santee Court, 714, 716, 720, and 724 S. Los Angeles Street, Arthur W. Angel (1911), Los Angeles Historic-Cultural Monument #710. Block of industrial buildings converted (203) to mixed-use (residential, commercial, retail, and arts), facing a courtyard. 
Heywood Bros. & Wakefield / Dearden's Home Furnishings buildings: 700-710 S. Main Street, 1899, Architect unknown (ca. 1899); John Parkinson remodel (ca. 1902); 712-718 S. Main Street, R. B. Young (1901): Now closed, the last incarnation of Dearden's was especially patronized by Latino Angelenos familiar with its Spanish-language advertising, and comprised three buildings, all of which previously housed furniture stores: Heywood Bros. & Wakefield Company (circa 1899) on the corner, which become Overell’s in 1906; Hulse, Bradford & Company (1901) just to the south; and a third industrial structure to the rear.

Department stores on 7th Street and on Broadway
This is a table of the openings of department stores along the 7th Street and Broadway corridors:

Flower Street shopping district
For a time in the 1920s, Flower Street one block north and south of 7th, was an upscale shopping district. It began with the establishment of Chappell's at 645 S. Flower, which moved there from 7th Street in 1921 into a two-story, Spanish-style building, which exuded intimacy and tranquility compared to busy 7th Street or Broadway. It was innovative in offering parking in the rear.

Barker Brothers opened their huge furniture emporium at 7th and Flower in 1926, two blocks west of J. W. Robinson's, which was already considered far west of the main Broadway shopping district. Myer Siegel followed a half block south, on Flower, that same year, as did Parmelee-Dohrmann, a large purveyor of china, crystal and silver. Other stores were Ashley & Evers, Ranschoff's, and Wetherby-Kayser shoes.

By 1931 Flower's heyday had petered out due to the depression, the opening of Bullock's Wilshire (1929) and I. Magnin (1939) much further west on Wilshire Blvd., as Myer Siegel's 1934 move to 7th Street.

References

Streets in Los Angeles
Former shopping districts and streets in Los Angeles